Balad Sport Club, is an Iraqi football team based in Balad District, Saladin, that plays in the Iraq Division Two.

History

The establishing
Balad Sport Club was established in 1989 after appeals and demands from the people of Balad to establish a club that officially represents the city. The club was established by an elite of the city's intellectuals after submitting the application for founding to the Iraqi Football Association, and the club was established after the official approval of the Football Association directly.

In Premier League
Balad played in the Iraqi Premier League for the first time in the 2004–05 season, and finished 7th in Group Stage, won 6 matches, drew 3 and lost 7, and relegated to the Iraq Division One.

Players

Current squad

Current technical staff

See also 
 2020–21 Iraq FA Cup
 2021–22 Iraq FA Cup

References

External links
 Balad SC on Goalzz.com
 Iraq Clubs- Foundation Dates

Football clubs in Saladin